Drinkin' Songs: The Collection is an extended play by Canadian country artist MacKenzie Porter. It was released on November 6, 2020 through Big Loud Records. It was Porter's debut American release, and includes the singles "About You", "These Days", "Seeing Other People", and "Drinkin' Songs".

Track listing

Charts

Singles

Awards and nominations

References

2020 EPs
Big Loud albums
Albums produced by Joey Moi